The Balzam class, Soviet designation Project 1826 is a class of intelligence collection ships built in the Soviet Union for the Soviet Navy during the 1980s. They are also known as Lira class, after the first vessel of the class.

Design and role

Built by the Yantar shipyard in Kaliningrad, they the first Soviet vessels specifically designed to gather SIGINT and COMINT electronic intelligence via an extensive array of sensors. The data could be transmitted to shore via satellite link antennas housed in two large radomes. They were the first Soviet AGIs to be armed, carrying one AK-630 CIWS gun system and Strela anti-aircraft missiles.

The last remaining Balzam class ship in active service is 344 ft in length, mounting a Medium Frequency sonar, High Frequency dipping sonar, Electronic warfare gear to include jammers, interception devices and code-breaking software. These ships were revolutionary when built in that they carried not only intercept and direction-finding electronics but also the necessary computing power to feed raw signal data into on-board information processing computers.

The ships has underway replenishment system same as two four-round Strela-2M (SA-N-5 Grail) IR-Guided SAM's and a single six-barrelled 30 mm gun installed. The weapons rely on a single remote Kolonka pedestal director instead of fire control radars, presumably to avoid interfering with the electronic support suite.

Ships

Operations
In July 2016, SSV-80 was deployed to monitor the RIMPAC 2016 naval exercises off Hawaii. The United States Coast Guard spotted the same ship south of Oahu in March 2020.

She was also deployed in May of 2022, presumably to observe the USS Ronald Reagan and her battle group as they deployed from their Japanese homeport.

See also
List of ships of the Soviet Navy
List of ships of Russia by project number

References

External links

 
 

Signals intelligence
Auxiliary ships of the Soviet Navy
Auxiliary surveillance ship classes